Alfred Dickens may refer to:

 Alfred Lamert Dickens (1822–1860), younger brother of novelist Charles Dickens
 Alfred D'Orsay Tennyson Dickens (1845–1912), son of Charles Dickens
 Alfred Dickens (cricketer) (1883–1938), English cricketer